Jean-Pierre Garnier (born 31 October 1947) is a French businessman, and a former chief executive of GlaxoSmithKline.

Early life
He was born in Le Mans in the Pays de la Loire region of western France. He attended Lycée Kléber in Strasbourg. He did a PhD at the Louis Pasteur University in Strasbourg.

Career

Schering-Plough
He joined the Belgian subsidiary of Schering-Plough in 1978. From 1989 to 1990 he was the manager of the US pharmaceuticals products division.

SmithKline Beecham
He joined SmithKline Beecham in 1990, becoming chief operating officer in 1995, then chief executive in May 2000.

GSK
In January 2001 he was appointed chief executive of GSK, during his tenure there were a number of controversies, after his retirement in 2008 GSK pleaded guilty to criminal charges

See also
 Sir Christopher Hogg, chairman of GSK

References

1947 births
Living people
Businesspeople in the pharmaceutical industry
French chief executives
People from Le Mans
GSK plc people
Chevaliers of the Légion d'honneur
Schering-Plough
University of Strasbourg alumni
Honorary Knights Commander of the Order of the British Empire
French expatriates in England